Crime SuspenStories was a bi-monthly anthology crime comic published by EC Comics in the early 1950s. The title first arrived on newsstands with its October/November 1950 issue and ceased publication with its February/March 1955 issue, producing a total of 27 issues. Years after its demise, the title was reprinted in its entirety, and four stories were adapted for television in the HBO's Tales From The Crypt.

Writers and artists
Each issue contained four stories centering on a wide variety of criminal activities, and it differed from other crime comic books of the period because the content was strongly influenced both by film noir and the writers of short fiction for magazines. Issues three through 16 featured a guest appearance from The Haunt of Fear'''s Old Witch.

Artists included Al Feldstein, Johnny Craig, George Evans, Jack Kamen, Wally Wood, Graham Ingels, Harvey Kurtzman, Jack Davis, George Roussos, Sid Check, Al Williamson, Fred Peters, Joe Orlando, Will Elder, Reed Crandall, Bernard Krigstein and Frank Frazetta. The predominant writers for the title were publisher William Gaines, Feldstein, and Craig from 1950 to 1953, along with other writers such as Carl Wessler, Otto Binder and Jack Oleck.

Craig was the lead artist for this title for the majority of its run, doing both the cover and the lead eight-page story. In 1954, Craig became editor of EC's The Vault of Horror. Since Craig was the slowest artist at EC, his new responsibilities forced him to drop his work on Crime SuspenStories. Evans, Crandall and Kamen assumed the cover and lead story responsibilities for the rest of the run. This was one of five titles cancelled by Gaines in 1954 due to the increasing controversy surrounding horror and crime comics and the subsequent unwillingness of distributors to ship his comic books.

Influences and adaptations
As with the other EC comics edited by Feldstein, the stories in this comic were primarily based on Gaines reading a large number of suspense stories and using them to develop "springboards" from which he and Feldstein could launch new stories. James M. Cain, Cornell Woolrich, Jim Thompson and radio's Suspense were some of the influences on Crime SuspenStories scripts. Specific story influences that have been identified include the following:

"Murder May Boomerang" (issue 1) – Samuel Blas' "Revenge"
"A Snapshot of Death" (issue 1) – Jules Verne's "Tribulations of a Chinaman in China"
"Poison!" (issue 3) – W. W. Jacobs's "Interruption"
"Blood Red Wine" (issue 3) – Edgar Allan Poe's "The Cask of Amontillado"
"The Gullible One" (issue 5) – Cornell Woolrich's "After-Dinner Story"
"A Question of Time" (issue 13) – John Collier's "De Mortuis"
"From Here to Insanity" (issue 18) – S. R. Ross' "You Got to Have Luck"
"In Each and Every Package" (issue 22) – John Collier's "Back for Christmas"

Anecdotes from Bennett Cerf's Try and Stop Me were sources for stories, including "Out of the Frying Pan..." (issue 8).

After their unauthorized adaptation of one of Ray Bradbury's stories in another magazine, Bradbury contacted EC about their plagiarism of his work. They reached an agreement for EC to do authorized versions of Bradbury's short fiction.  These official adaptations include:

"The Screaming Woman" (issue 15)
"Touch and Go" (issue 17)

ReprintsCrime SuspenStories has been reprinted numerous times over the years. Ballantine Books reprinted selected stories in a series of paperback EC anthologies in 1964–66. The magazine was fully reprinted in a series of five black-and-white hardbacks by publisher Russ Cochran as part of The Complete EC Library in 1983. Between November 1992 and May 1999, Cochran (in association with Gemstone Publishing) reprinted the full 27 individual issues.  This complete run was later rebound, with covers included, in a series of five softcover EC Annuals.  In 2008, Cochran and Gemstone began to publish hardcover, re-colored volumes of Crime SuspenStories as part of the EC Archives series.  One volume (of a projected five) was published before Gemstone's financial troubles left the project in limbo.  But the project may soon be revived under a new publisher.  GC Press LLC, a boutique imprint established by Russ Cochran and Grant Geissman, announced in a press release dated September 1, 2011 that it is continuing the EC Archives series, with the first new releases scheduled for November 2011.

Media adaptations
Four stories were used in HBO's Tales From The Crypt television series: Two for the Show (issue 17), In the Groove (21), This'll Kill Ya (23) and Maniac at Large (27).

Issue guide

 Footnotes 

References
Goulart, Ron. Great American Comic Books. Publications International, Ltd., 2001. .
Overstreet, Robert M.. Official Overstreet Comic Book Price Guide''. House of Collectibles, 2004.

EC Comics publications
Crime comics
Tales from the Crypt
Comics anthologies
Comics by Carl Wessler